Heimo Pfeifenberger (born 29 December 1966) is an Austrian professional football manager and a former player. He is the manager of SV Grödig.

Club career
On club level Pfeifenberger played for USV Zederhaus (youth career), Austria Salzburg, Werder Bremen, SK Rapid Wien, SV Seekirchen 1945 and SV Grödig. He celebrated most success at Austria Salzburg. In 1994 and 1995, he won the league title and the Austrian Supercup with Salzburg. He played in the first leg of the 1994 UEFA Cup Final which they lost to Inter Milan. In the Austrian 1993–94 season, he became Bundesliga top scorer with 14 goals. In total he scored 74 goals for Salzburg and 43 for Rapid, making him one of the best goalscorers in the Austrian league.

International career
Pfeifenberger made his debut for Austria in an August 1989 World Cup qualification match against Iceland and was a participant at the 1990 FIFA World Cup and the 1998 FIFA World Cup. He earned 40 caps, scoring nine goals. His last international was an August 1998 friendly match against France.

Coaching career

Pfeifenberger was hired as the new coach of Wiener Neustadt on 30 May 2012. He left the club on 12 November 2014. On 25 November 2015, Pfeifenberger was unveiled as the new manager of Wolfsberger AC, replacing Dietmar Kühbauer.

On 8 January 2020, he became a head coach of Lithuanian defending champions FK Sūduva. The club terminated the contract on 14 April, just after two games. 

On 1 July 2020, he returned to SV Grödig.

Coaching record

Honours
 Austrian Football Bundesliga: 1993–94, 1994–95
 Austrian Bundesliga top goalscorer: 1993–94

References

External links
 Heimo Pfeifenberger at Rapid archive
 

1966 births
Living people
People from Tamsweg District
Austrian footballers
Austrian expatriate footballers
Austria international footballers
1990 FIFA World Cup players
1998 FIFA World Cup players
FC Red Bull Salzburg players
SK Rapid Wien players
SV Werder Bremen players
Austrian Football Bundesliga players
Bundesliga players
Expatriate footballers in Germany
Association football forwards
Association football wingers
SC Wiener Neustadt managers
Austrian football managers
Footballers from Salzburg (state)
Austrian expatriate sportspeople in Germany
Austrian expatriate football managers
Expatriate football managers in Lithuania
Austrian expatriate sportspeople in Lithuania